George Robertson Dennis (April 8, 1822 – August 13, 1882), a Democrat, was a United States Senator from Maryland, serving from 1873 to 1879.  He also served in the Maryland State Senate and the Maryland House of Delegates.

Early life
Dennis was born in Whitehaven, Maryland to Maria (née Robertson) and John Upshur Dennis. His brother was James U. Dennis. His half-brother was Samuel K. Dennis. He graduated from Rensselaer Polytechnic Institute in Troy, New York. He entered the University of Virginia at Charlottesville, and studied medicine at the University of Pennsylvania School of Medicine in Philadelphia. He graduated in 1843 and practiced in Kingston, Maryland, for many years, until later devoting himself to agricultural pursuits.

Career
In 1854 and 1871, Dennis served as a member of the Maryland State Senate, and in 1867 served in the Maryland House of Delegates.  He was elected as a Democrat to the United States Senate and served from March 4, 1873, until March 3, 1879.

Personal life
He died in Kingston in 1882, and is interred in St. Andrew's Churchyard of Princess Anne, Maryland.

References

1822 births
1882 deaths
Democratic Party Maryland state senators
Democratic Party members of the Maryland House of Delegates
Democratic Party United States senators from Maryland
Rensselaer Polytechnic Institute alumni
People from Wicomico County, Maryland
Perelman School of Medicine at the University of Pennsylvania alumni
19th-century American politicians